The speaker of the Legislative Council was the chair of New Zealand's appointed upper house, the Legislative Council. The office corresponded roughly to that of speaker of the House of Representatives. The functions of the speaker included presiding over debates held in the chamber of the Council, and advising the legislative councillors on procedural rules. The position was abolished in 1951, along with the Legislative Council itself.

Holders of the office
Eighteen people held the office of speaker since the creation of the Legislative Council. Two had previously been premier, and another went on to serve in that office; one had previously been speaker of the House of Representatives. A comprehensive list of speakers is below.

Key

†: died in office

1 Later served as premier.
2 Previously served as premier.
3 Previously speaker of the House of Representatives.
4 Reappointed at end of member's term.
† Speaker died in office.

See also
Constitution of New Zealand
New Zealand Legislative Council

References

Constitution of New Zealand
New Zealand, Legislative Council, Speaker

Speakers